Kaliakra Lighthouse - a lighthouse located in the Southern Dobruja Region on the northern part of Bulgaria's coast of the Black Sea; in Bulgaria. The cylindrical stone lighthouse was built in 1901, with a lantern and gallery rising from the top of the lighthouse keeper's house; both painted white.

See also
List of lighthouses in Bulgaria

References

Lighthouses completed in 1901
Resort architecture in Bulgaria
Lighthouses in Bulgaria